WWKX (106.3 FM, "Hot 106") is a rhythmic contemporary station in Woonsocket, Rhode Island, serving the Blackstone Valley and much of the Providence metropolitan area. The Cumulus Media outlet operates with an ERP of 1.15 kW and is licensed to Woonsocket.  The station's studios are located in East Providence and the transmitter site is in Cumberland.

History
The current WWKX signed on June 26, 1949, as WWON-FM on 105.5 FM as the sister station to WWON (now WOON).  In 1950, WWON-FM operated with 390 watts.  WWON-FM changed frequencies to the current 106.3 by summer 1958.  In the 1970s, the station played oldies, and in 1986 became WNCK.  In 1988, it flipped to urban contemporary as WWKX "Kicks 106" (later "Kix 106"), before it shifted to rhythmic contemporary as "The Rhythm of Southern New England" in November 1990; the format scored high ratings in the 18-34 demographic from 1995–1997. By February 1998, the station adopted its current moniker and tweaked its playlist towards a pure R&B/Hip-Hop flavor.

WWKX was the only rhythmic top 40 in the United States to air Howard Stern from 1997 to January 5, 2005, when parent company Citadel Broadcasting ceased airing the show in a dispute regarding Stern's mentioning of his upcoming move to Sirius Satellite Radio. Citadel merged with Cumulus Media on September 16, 2011.

The call letters WWKX were assigned to 104.5 in Gallatin/Nashville, Tennessee from 1978 to 1987. This frequency is now occupied by WGFX, also a Cumulus station.

References

External links
WWKX official website

List of FM stations in the U.S. in 1950 as listed in the 1950 Broadcasting Yearbook
List of FM stations in the U.S. in the summer of 1958 as listed in the North American Radio TV Station Listings, by Vane A. Jones.

WKX
Rhythmic contemporary radio stations in the United States
Cumulus Media radio stations
Radio stations established in 1949
Woonsocket, Rhode Island
1949 establishments in Rhode Island